Ashley Hodson (born 5 May 1995) is an English female footballer who plays as a midfielder for FA Women's Championship club Birmingham City on loan from Liverpool.

Club career
A product of Liverpool's youth development programme, Hodson made her senior debut on 13 April 2014, in a 2–0 win over Sunderland in the fifth round of the FA Women's Cup. On 20 April 2014, she made her league debut in a 0–0 draw against Chelsea. In the 2014 season, she made a total of 11 appearances in all competitions and won her first FA WSL title. On 30 July 2015, Hodson scored her first goal in a 3–0 away victory against Doncaster Rovers Belles in the FA WSL Cup. On 7 October 2015, she made her UEFA Women's Champions League debut in a 1–0 away loss to Brescia. On 25 November 2015, Hodson signed a new contract with the club. In the 2015 season, she made a total of 18 appearances, scoring one goal. In the 2016 season, she made 10 league appearances and 2 FA WSL Cup appearances. In the 2017 season, she started every league and FA Women's Cup match, making a total of 11 appearances. On 23 November 2017, Liverpool announced that Hodson had signed new deal with the club. She made her 50th domestic appearance for Liverpool in a 2–0 win over Everton on the opening day of the 2017–18 season. On 18 February 2018, she scored her first FA Women's Cup goal in a 3–0 away victory against Chichester City.

Career statistics

.

Honours

Club
FA WSL: 2014
FA Women's Championship: 2021–22

References

External links

 
 Ashley Hodson at Liverpool FC
 

1995 births
Living people
English women's footballers
Women's association football forwards
Liverpool F.C. Women players
Birmingham City W.F.C. players
Women's Super League players
Footballers from Preston, Lancashire